Time For Lovers is a solo album released in 1985 by Frank Duval.

Track listing
"Lord" - 8:13
"A Day Like Today" - 4:20
"Out Of Seasons" - 3:36
"Time For Lovers" - 5:09
"Mysterious Girl" - 5:56
"It Was Love" - 4:54
"Changeover" - 3:06
"Angel By My Side" - 4:26
"Time For Lovers (epilog)" - 3:32

References

1985 albums
Frank Duval albums
Albums produced by Frank Duval